Cather may refer to:

 Geoffrey Cather (1890–1916), Victoria Cross recipient
Joan Cather (1882-1967), British suffragette, awarded a Hunger Strike Medal
 Mike Cather (born 1970), baseball player 
 Ted Cather (1889–1945), baseball player 
 Willa Cather (1873–1947), author
 William Cather Hook (1857–1921), judge

See also

 Brad Cathers
 Cather House (disambiguation)
 Willa Cather Birthplace
 Willa Cather House